Breston Plantation House in Caldwell Parish, Louisiana, was built in the 1830s.  It was added to the National Register of Historic Places in 1980.

The house shows a mixture of French Creole architecture and Greek Revival architecture.  Exterior Greek Revival elements are its five-bay front facade, with center emphasis; six molded Doric posts and entablature of the front gallery; six matching pilasters along the front wall of the house.

See also 
National Register of Historic Places listings in Caldwell Parish, Louisiana

References

External links
Louisiana Herbs website

Houses on the National Register of Historic Places in Louisiana
Houses completed in 1835
Creole architecture
Greek Revival architecture in Louisiana
Houses in Caldwell Parish, Louisiana
National Register of Historic Places in Caldwell Parish, Louisiana
Plantations in Louisiana